Songs From Home is Lea Salonga's all-Filipino album (OPM) performed during a sold-out 2-night concert at the Plenary Hall of the Philippine International Convention Center in Pasay on September 12 and 13, 2003. The album includes some of the Philippines' most well-known artists.

"This is quite possibly the most special concert I've ever done. Throughout my many years of performing, never have I had the joy of singing a concert repertoire composed solely of Original Filipino music. The preparation process has been challenging, nerve wracking, and at times frustrating, but definitely exciting and very fulfilling. My heart is full that for the next couple of hours, we'll be able to share some (unfortunately, only some) of the best music ever written…"

Track listing 
Salamat, Salamat Musika
Hahanapin Ko
Basil Valdez Medley (Ngayon, Kung Ako'y Iiwan Mo, kastilyong Buhangin, Paano Ba Ang Mangarap, Gaano Kadalas ang Minsan)
Isang linggong Pag-ibig
Ako ang Nagwagi
Waray Waray / Galawgaw
Regine Velasquez / Ogie Alcasid Medley (Kailangan ko'y Ikaw, Pangarap Ko ang Ibigin Ka, Hanggang Ngayon)
Minsan Lang Kitang Iibigin (Ariel Rivera)
Sharon Cuneta Medley (Langis at Tubig, Kahapon Lamang, Bituing Walang, Ningning, Sana'y Wala ng Wakas, Pangarap na Bituin, Init sa Magdamag)
Anak
Laki sa Layaw (jeproks)

Lea Salonga albums
2003 albums